Klemens is a German language surname. It stems from the male given name Clemens – and may refer to:
Anna Klemens (1718–1800), Danish murder victim
Ben Klemens (1975), Australian economist
Jozef Božetech Klemens (1817–1883), Slovak portrait painter, sculptor, photographer, inventor and naturalist

References 

German-language surnames
Surnames from given names